Cotness is a small hamlet in the East Riding of Yorkshire, England, it forms part of the civil parish of Laxton.

References

External links

Villages in the East Riding of Yorkshire